"The Nitty Gritty" is a 1963 song written by Lincoln Chase and recorded by Shirley Ellis.  Released by Congress Records, it reached #8 on the Billboard Hot 100 in early 1964.

Cover versions
Motown released a version of "The Nitty Gritty" by Gladys Knight & The Pips in mid-1969 on its Soul imprint.  It went to #19 on the Billboard Hot 100 and #2 on the Soul chart. 
A version by Diana Ross & The Supremes can be found on the 2001 edition of their album, Anthology
Southern Culture on the Skids covered it on the Dirt Track Date album.

Popular culture
A 1963 televised performance of the dance associated with the song by Robert Banas, recorded for an episode of The Judy Garland Show, has more than 10 million views on YouTube.

References

1963 singles
1969 singles
2006 singles
Songs written by Lincoln Chase
1963 songs
Novelty songs